France's Concert Records was a 1980s independent French jazz and blues record label (also known as Esoldun INA) that is now defunct, that was set up by Esoldun to exploit the Institut National de l'Audiovisuel (INA)'s recording archives. Distribution was by Wotre Music.

Partial discography
FCD 101 -  Earl Hines - Hine's Tune
FCD 102 -  Charles Mingus - Meditation
FCD 103 -  Milt Buckner - Play, Milt, Play
FCD 104 -  Coleman Hawkins - Lover Man
FCD 105 -  Thelonious Monk - Evidence
FCD 106 -  John Coltrane - Love Supreme
FCD 107 -  Bill Evans - Live In Paris, 1972 Vol. 1
FCD 108 -  Wes Montgomery - Live In Paris, 1965
FCD 109 -  Roland Kirk - Live In Paris, 1970, Vol. 1
FCD 110 -  Charles Mingus - Live In Paris, 1964, Vol. 2
FCD 111 -  Freddy King - Live In Antibes, 1974
FCD 112 -  Count Basie - Live In Antibes, 1968
FCD 113 -  Thelonious Monk - Thelonious Monk Nonet Live In Paris 1967
FCD 114 -  Bill Evans - Live In Paris, 1972, Vol. 2
FCD 115 -  Roland Kirk - Live In Paris, 1970, Vol. 2
FCD 116 -  Muddy Waters - Live In Antibes, 1974
FCD 117 -  Woody Herman - Live in Antibes, 1965
FCD 118 -  Sister Rosetta Tharpe - Live in Paris, 1964
FCD 119 -  John Coltrane - Live in Antibes, 1965
FCD 120 -  Stuff Smith - Live in Paris, 1965
FCD 121 -  Muddy Waters - Live in Paris, 1968
FCD 122 -  Mahalia Jackson - Live in Antibes, 1968
FCD 123 -  Chet Baker - Live in Paris, 1960-63 - Live in Nice, 1975
FCD 124 -  Sarane & Matelo Ferret - Tribute to Django
FCD 125 -  Bill Evans - Live in Paris, 1972, Vol. 3
FCD 126 -  Freddy King - Live in Nancy, 1975, Vol. 1
FCD 127 -  Memphis Slim - Live in Paris, 1963
FCD 128 -  Chet Baker - Live in Chateauvallon, 1978
FCD 129 -  Freddy King - Live in Nancy, 1975, Vol. 2
FCD 130 -  France's Concert - Anthology vol.1  	
FCD 131 -  Ben Webster - Live in Paris, 1972
FCD 132 -  Thelonious Monk - Live in Paris, 1964 (FCD 132x2/Double CD)
FCF 133 -  Arnett Cobb - Tiny Grimes Quintet - Live in Paris, 1974
FCD 134 -  Charles Mingus - Live in Chateauvallon, 1972
FCD 135 -  Thelonious Monk - Live in Paris, 1964 - Alhambra, Vol. 1

References

French record labels
Jazz record labels
Blues record labels
France's Concert Records albums